Presidential elections were held in Ecuador in 1912. The result was a victory for Leónidas Plaza, who received 98% of the vote.

Results

References

Presidential elections in Ecuador
Eduador
1912 in Ecuador
Election and referendum articles with incomplete results